The Madhya Pradesh Vidhan Sabha or the Madhya Pradesh Legislative Assembly is the unicameral state legislature of Madhya Pradesh state in India.

The seat of the Vidhan Sabha is at Bhopal, the capital of the state. It is housed in the Vidhan Bhavan, an imposing building located at the center of the Capital Complex in the Arera Hill locality of Bhopal city. The term of the Vidhan Sabha is five years unless dissolved earlier. Presently, it comprises 230 members who are directly elected from single-seat constituencies.33 constituencies are reserved for the candidates belonging to the Scheduled castes and 45 are reserved for the candidates belonging to the Scheduled tribes.

History
The history of the Madhya Pradesh legislature can be traced back to 1913, as the Central Provinces Legislative Council was formed on 8 November of this year.  Later, the Government of India Act 1935 provided for the elected Central Provinces Legislative assembly.  The first elections to the Central Provinces Legislative Assembly were held in 1937.

After Indian independence in 1947, the erstwhile province of Central Provinces and Berar, along with a number of princely states merged with the Indian Union, became a new state, Madhya Pradesh. The strength of the legislative assembly of this state was 184.

The present-day Madhya Pradesh state came into existence on 1 November 1956 following the reorganization of states. It was created by merging the erstwhile Madhya Pradesh (without the Marathi speaking areas, which were merged with Bombay state), Madhya Bharat, Vindhya Pradesh and Bhopal states.  The strengths of the legislative assemblies of Madhya Bharat, Vindhya Pradesh, and Bhopal were 79, 48, and 23, respectively. On 1 November 1956, the legislative assemblies of all four erstwhile states were also merged to form the reorganized Madhya Pradesh Vidhan Sabha. The tenure of this first Vidhan Sabha was very short, and it was dissolved on 5 March 1957.

The first elections to the Madhya Pradesh Vidhan Sabha were held in 1957, and the second Vidhan Sabha was constituted on 1 April 1957. Initially, the strength of the Vidhan Sabha was 288, which was later enhanced to 321, including one nominated member. On 1 November 2000, a new state, Chhattisgarh, was carved out of Madhya Pradesh state. As a result, the strength of the Vidhan Sabha was reduced to 231, including a nominated member. The present house, the fifteenth Vidhan Sabha, was constituted in December 2018.

The present building was designed by Charles Correa in 1967, and it was the recipient of the Aga Khan Award for Architecture in 1998.

On 4 December 2017, Madhya Pradesh Assembly  unanimously passed a Bill awarding death to those found guilty of raping girls aged 12 and below.

Members of Legislative Assembly

See also
 Elections in Madhya Pradesh
 List of constituencies of Madhya Pradesh Vidhan Sabha

Notes

External links
 

 
State legislatures of India
Unicameral legislatures